Brian Poole (born October 20, 1992) is an American football cornerback who is a free agent. He played college football at Florida and signed with the Atlanta Falcons as an undrafted free agent in 2016.

High school career
Poole attended Southeast High School in Bradenton, Florida and graduated in 2012. He played for the football team. He was recruited by the University of Florida, where he committed to play under new head coach Will Muschamp.

College career
Poole played college football for the Gators from 2012–2015. In the 2012 season, he recorded three total tackles. In the 2013 season, he recorded 32 total tackles, two tackles-for-loss, two interceptions, and three passes defended. In the 2014 season, he recorded 45 total tackles, three tackles-for-loss, four interceptions, two forced fumbles, and one fumble recovery. In the 2015 season, he recorded 40 total tackles, 1.5 tackles-for-loss, .5 sacks, five forced fumbles, and one fumble recovery.

Professional career

Atlanta Falcons
On May 5, 2016, the Atlanta Falcons signed Poole as an undrafted free agent on a three-year, $1.62 million contract that includes a signing bonus of $3,500. Poole received offers from multiple teams, including the Los Angeles Rams, Pittsburgh Steelers, and Arizona Cardinals. He chose to sign with Atlanta Falcons due to his past relationship with head coach Dan Quinn, who recruited Poole to Florida and was his defensive coordinator there.

Throughout training camp, he competed for a roster spot against DeMarcus Van Dyke, Akeem King, C. J. Goodwin, David Mims, Devonte Johnson, and Jordan Sefon. He was named the third cornerback on the depth chart, behind Desmond Trufant and Robert Alford, and was also given nickel coverage duties.

He had his first career interception in Week 16 against the Carolina Panthers on quarterback Cam Newton. He played in all 16 games with nine starts as a rookie, recording 59 tackles, 10 passes defensed, and one interception. In the postseason, he played in all three games, starting two, including Super Bowl LI, which the Falcons lost in overtime to the New England Patriots by a score of 34–28. In the Super Bowl, Poole had four total tackles.

In 2017, Poole played in 15 games with three starts as the Falcons' No. 3 cornerback, recording 63 tackles and four passes defensed.

In 2018, Poole played in all 16 games with nine starts, he recorded career-highs in both interceptions and sacks, with three in both category.

New York Jets
On March 15, 2019, Poole signed a one-year, $3.5 million contract with the New York Jets.
In week 12 against the Oakland Raiders, Poole recorded an interception off a pass thrown by Derek Carr and returned it for a 15 yard touchdown in the 34–3 win.

On March 21, 2020, Poole re-signed with the Jets. He was placed on injured reserve on November 17, 2020 after suffering shoulder and knee injuries in Week 9.

New Orleans Saints
On July 25, 2021, Poole signed a one-year contract with the New Orleans Saints. He was placed on injured reserve on August 24, 2021. He was released on October 12.

New England Patriots
On October 27, 2021, Poole was signed to the New England Patriots practice squad. He was released on November 9.

Indianapolis Colts
On November 22, 2021, Poole was signed to the Indianapolis Colts practice squad.

References

External links
Atlanta Falcons bio
Florida Gators bio

1992 births
Living people
Sportspeople from Bradenton, Florida
Players of American football from Florida
American football cornerbacks
Florida Gators football players
Atlanta Falcons players
New York Jets players
New Orleans Saints players
New England Patriots players
Indianapolis Colts players